Oxyptilini is a tribe within the subfamily Pterophorinae of the plume moths or Pterophoridae. The monophyly of this group was established in a 2011 phylogenetic study.  A key to distinguish the genera within this tribe was published in 2010.

References

 
Pterophorinae
Moth tribes